Andrew David Daniels (born 11 March 1983) is an English cricketer.  Daniels is a right-handed batsman who bowls leg break and who can field as a wicketkeeper.  He was born at Kettering, Northamptonshire.

Daniels represented the Northamptonshire Cricket Board in a single List A match against the Yorkshire Cricket Board in the 1st round of the 2003 Cheltenham & Gloucester Trophy which was played in 2002.  In his only List A match he scored 2 runs.

References

External links
Andrew Daniels at Cricinfo
Andrew Daniels at CricketArchive

1983 births
Living people
Sportspeople from Kettering
English cricketers
Northamptonshire Cricket Board cricketers
Wicket-keepers